The Isuzu 117 Coupé is a compact Gran Turismo type 2-door fastback coupé which was produced by the Japanese automobile manufacturer Isuzu between 1968 and 1981. 117 was a codename for a common development program of Isuzu mid-size cars, involving a coupé, sedan and station wagon. The latter two eventually became the Isuzu Florian, but the coupe kept the original name, and both models shared mechanicals, including the complete FR layout chassis with recirculating ball steering.

The 117 Coupé was styled by the famous Giorgetto Giugiaro, being one of the first Japanese cars designed by an Italian stylist. It was among the first Japanese cars with a DOHC engine, and the first with electronic fuel injection. The 117 can be regarded as the world's first sports car to be available with a diesel engine. It was quite an exclusive vehicle during its lifetime, and is a rare collectible now, but thanks to its unusually long lifecycle, Isuzu manufactured 86,192 units. The 117 Coupé was replaced by the Isuzu Piazza in the Isuzu lineup.

Early years

The 117 Coupé was debuted as a prototype at the 1966 Geneva Motor Show, and was later shown at the Tokyo Motor Show the same year. In 1968, Isuzu started preliminary small-scale production of 117 Coupés, which were effectively handmade in amounts rarely exceeding 50 a month. Its marketing approach was similar to the Nissan Silvia, produced around the same time, followed later by the Toyota 2000GT. As the Japanese auto industry began to experience a significant amount of sales, Isuzu also realized they needed an exotic car to draw buyers into showrooms that would then drive sales of more affordable products, like the Isuzu Bellett. Influenced by Japanese special significance cultural traditions, senior management saw the company as a "premiere" limited production manufacturer and was the only company that didn't offer a kei car while most Japanese manufacturers did.

The first engine available was a 1.6 L DOHC inline-four, and in 1970, an electronic fuel injection unit from Bosch debuted, using the D-Jetronic system. The model fitted with fuel injection was named the EC (for "electronic control").

The car came with a long list of standard equipment (including leather seats, dashboard trim made of Taiwanese camphor laurel wood, and headrests) and was very expensive for Japanese standards. This concerned also the less luxurious 1800N version added in 1971, powered by a simpler 1.8 L SOHC carbureted engine.

Mass production and first facelift
With the 117 Coupé becoming a very popular and desired model, and the advent of the cooperation with General Motors, Isuzu decided to shift the model to mass production. This change took place in March 1973. Sales (in the Japanese domestic market) jumped accordingly, from 965 units in 1972 to 9506 units in 1974. The 1.8 L engine became standard, with several versions available, with or without fuel injection and with DOHC or SOHC valvetrains. Outputs dropped somewhat in October 1975, due to new stricter emissions regulations taking effect.

In May 1976 the manual transmissions were changed to five-speed units.

Second facelift
In November 1977, Isuzu decided to afford the 117 Coupe second facelift, which resulted in replacing the previous front fascia with four round headlights with more modern one rectangular lights (keeping their number at four) as well as a front air dam. In an effort to further decrease manufacturing costs, plastic moldings were used in the interior. In 1978, the 1.95 litre engine debuted, and in 1979 the XD diesel-powered version was added.

Starting in 1979, a special version called the Giugiaro Edition was available. Production of the 117 Coupé lasted until 1981, when it was replaced by the Piazza, also styled by Giugiaro.

References

External links

 A page devoted to highlighting Giugiaro's involvement in the 117 design
 1968 Isuzu 117 Coupé technical specifications from Carfolio
 1979 Isuzu 117 XDL Coupé technical specifications from Global Car Locator

117 Coupe
Rear-wheel-drive vehicles
Sports cars
Coupés
1970s cars
1980s cars
Cars introduced in 1968